Clement Attlee received numerous honours in recognition of his career in politics. These included:

Hereditary Peerage
Attlee was elevated to the House of Lords on 16 December 1955, upon his standing down as leader of the Labour Party and from his seat in the House of Commons. He took the title Earl Attlee, with the subsidiary title of Viscount Prestwood, of Walthamstow in the County of Essex. He sat with the Labour Party benches.

Coat of Arms
As a peer of the realm, Attlee was entitled to use a personal coat of arms.

Commonwealth Honours

Commonwealth Realms

Decorations and Medals

Other Distinctions

Scholastic

 University Degrees

 Chancellor, visitor, governor, rector and fellowships

Honorary Degrees

Memberships and Fellowships

Freedom of the City

  18 October 1947: Birmingham.
  18 December 1951: Leeds.
  20 November 1953: London.
  1953: Manchester.
  16 January 1956: Oxford.
  5 June 1956: Aberdeen.
  Unknown: Bristol.

Places named after Attlee

  Attlee A Level Academy at the New City College.
  Attlee Way, Leicester (52.5974212, -1.1350528)

Limerick
Attlee referred to his many honours in a limerick he composed about his career:
There were few who thought him a starter,
Many who thought themselves smarter.
But he ended PM,
CH and OM,
an Earl and a Knight of the Garter.

References

Clement Attlee
Attlee, Clement
Attlee, Clement